is a Japanese video game developer and publisher, mainly known for their Tenchu and Way of the Samurai series. Acquire was founded on December 6, 1994, and in 1998 developed Tenchu: Stealth Assassins for the PlayStation, which turned into a franchise. The developer pushed for a more sandbox approach to the level design, which found its way in other Acquire titles like Way of the Samurai and Shinobido: Way of the Ninja. In 2011, the company was acquired by GungHo Online Entertainment. Acquire co-developed Octopath Traveler with Square Enix, releasing in 2018. Acquire was chosen as development partner for the game based on their affinity with pixel-art and prior work on the What Did I Do to Deserve This, My Lord? series. Acquire developed Katana Kami: A Way of the Samurai Story, which released in 2020, following the cancellation of a fifth Way of the Samurai entry.

Games developed

References

External links
Official website 
Official website (in English)

Video game publishers
GungHo Online Entertainment
Video game companies of Japan
Video game development companies
Video game companies established in 1994
Japanese companies established in 1994
Software companies based in Tokyo
2011 mergers and acquisitions